The Valentine (in its upper course: Ruisseau de Drouly and Ruisseau de Marsaguet) is a stream in the Haute-Vienne department, France. It is a tributary of the Boucheuse, and part of the Dordogne basin.

The river begins in the commune of La Roche-l'Abeille and joins the Boucheuse at its right bank 3 km south of Coussac-Bonneval.

References

Rivers of Haute-Vienne
Rivers of France
Rivers of Nouvelle-Aquitaine